Alfredo Lardelli (1956 – 21 July 2015), alias Alfredo Borgatte dos Santos, was a Swiss entrepreneur, who – according to himself - worked “30 percent as a legal adviser, 30 percent as an estate agent and 40 percent as an adviser for the red light-scene”. He gained his knowledge about jurisprudence autodidactically. 

He became known to a broad public thanks to the media reporting about his various lawsuits.
In 1989, Lardelli was sentenced to twenty years in prison for murdering two prostitutes and the husband of his then-girlfriend. In prison, he married a Brazilian woman and adopted her family name, Borgatte dos Santos. After his early discharge in 1999 due to good behaviour, he had a big media presence, e.g. in Swiss TV and in rainbow press-paper Blick, which dedicated a series to him that lasted six issues.
Lardelli wanted to open up an establishment in Wagen (Gemeinde Jona). This led to various legal arguments. Lardelli had to appear in court, because he supposedly threatened to kill an opponent of his project.
In 2006 and inspired by Lardelli, legal actions were taken against Ueli Maurer, president of political party SVP, because of alleged falsification of documents; Maurer was acquitted. 

Lardelli died of multiple organ failure in 2015 at the age of 58.

References 

Swiss people convicted of murder
Swiss businesspeople
Swiss spree killers
People convicted of murder by Switzerland
Deaths from multiple organ failure
2015 deaths
1956 births